Oru Odai Nadhiyagirathu is a 1983 Indian Tamil-language film, written, produced and directed by C. V. Sridhar and starring Raghuvaran. The female leads were Sumalatha and Manochitra (daughter of T. S. Balaiah).

Plot 

Raghuvaran visits his friend's place on a tour and one night he happens to see a woman while he was returning from a party. On that rainy night, he rapes her and leaves. He speaks about this incident to his friend and his friend advises him not to search for that girl, as she would have forgotten it. Haunted by guilty feelings, Raghuvaran searches for her later, but is unable to find her.

Meanwhile, the woman (Sumalatha) becomes pregnant and unable to come in terms with this incident, she leaves that place with her father (Prathapachandran). In a new place, she gives birth to a boy, and she tries to search for Raghuvaran, even though she never recalls his face from that dreaded rainy night.

Later, Raghuvaran marries Manochitra as everyone forces him, even though he is still fond of Sumalatha, the woman he raped. Whether Sumalatha finds Raghuvaran and what happens to Manochitra, or whether Raghuvaran identifies his son forms the climax.

Cast 

Raghuvaran
Sumalatha
Manochithra
Prathapachandran
Kathadi Ramamurthy
M. R. Krishnamurthy
Typist Gopu
Anuradha

Soundtrack 
The soundtrack was composed by Ilaiyaraaja. The song "Thendral Ennai Muththam ittadhu" song is in Malayamarutam raga, "Kanavu Ondru" is set in Revati, and "Thalaiyai Kuniyum" is set in Reetigowla.

Reception 
Jeyamanmadhan of Kalki said the actors underacted.

References

External links 
 

1980s Tamil-language films
1983 films
Films directed by C. V. Sridhar
Films scored by Ilaiyaraaja
Films with screenplays by C. V. Sridhar